The North–South Trail (RI) is a  hiking trail that runs the length of Rhode Island from the Atlantic Ocean in Charlestown to the Massachusetts border in Burrillville, Rhode Island. The trail is remarkably rural and scenic. Features include attractive lakeshores, bogs, beaches, hills, rock outcrops, farmland, and dense woodland.

The North–South Trail is the logical extension of the Midstate Trail in Massachusetts and the Wapack Trail in New Hampshire; these three trails together make up a  greenway footpath.

References
 Greenways Alliance of Rhode Island. cited Dec.6 2007.

Hiking trails in Rhode Island
Protected areas of Kent County, Rhode Island
Protected areas of Providence County, Rhode Island
Protected areas of Washington County, Rhode Island